(1551–1616) was a Jodo Shinshu Buddhist priest within Hongan-ji. 

The comings and goings of the temple were administered by Nakataka. At the same time in which Hongan-ji Kennyo fought against Oda Nobunaga, he led the defenses in the siege of Ishiyama Hongan-ji.

References
 下間少進抄伝（I） (Japanese)

1551 births
1616 deaths
Jōdo Shinshū Buddhist priests